Kunchi may refer to one of the following:

From Japanese kunchi meaning "festival" 
Nagasaki Kunchi
Karatsu Kunchi
Shiota Kunchi, in Shiota, Saga

Personal name 
Lu Kunchi,  a Taiwanese football goalkeeper
Kunchi, also spelled as Kaunchi or Kuwinji of White Horde, a descendant of Genghis Khan

Places
Kunchi, Nigeria, a Local Government Area in Kano State
Kunchi, Bonaire, an abandoned town in Bonaire